Hans Schatzmann (24 January 1848 in Windisch, Switzerland – 12 July 1923) was a Swiss politician who served as the fifth Chancellor of Switzerland.

He studied at Aarau, then pursued legal studies at the universities of Zurich, Heidelberg, Munich, and Berlin, where he passed his bar exam in 1871.

He worked at Brugg and Lenzburg before being named tribunal president at Aarau. In 1879, he was named Secretary and bureau chief of the Federal Chancellory. He became Vice-Chancellor in 1881, where he would frequently serve as acting Chancellor as the holder of that title Gottlieb Ringier was ill. He was elected as Chancellor in 1909.

As a specialist in federal administration, he participated in the redaction of the law on federal administration in 1914 and was the founder of the publication Federal Paper in Italian. He retired in 1918 and died of apoplexy five years later.

References

Literature

External links 
 

Federal Chancellors of Switzerland
1848 births
1923 deaths
20th-century Swiss politicians